Left-right determination factor 2 is a protein that in humans is encoded by the LEFTY2 gene.

Function

This gene encodes a member of the TGF-beta family of proteins. The encoded protein is secreted and plays a role in left-right asymmetry determination of organ systems during development. The protein may also play a role in endometrial bleeding. Mutations in this gene have been associated with left-right axis malformations, particularly in the heart and lungs. Some types of infertility have been associated with dysregulated expression of this gene in the endometrium. Alternative processing of this protein can yield three different products. This gene is closely linked to both a related family member and a related pseudogene. Alternate splicing of this gene results in multiple transcript variants.

References

Further reading 

Proteins